Qiaozhuang may refer to these towns in China:

Qiaozhuang, Shandong, in Boxing County, Shandong
Qiaozhuang, Sichuan, in Qingchuan County, Sichuan